Wilfred Mwalawanda (born 20 December 1944) is a Malawian athlete. He competed in the men's decathlon at the 1972 Summer Olympics.

References

1944 births
Living people
Athletes (track and field) at the 1972 Summer Olympics
Malawian decathletes
Malawian male javelin throwers
Olympic athletes of Malawi
Athletes (track and field) at the 1970 British Commonwealth Games
Commonwealth Games competitors for Malawi
Place of birth missing (living people)